Nav Prerna School, Sikar located in Sikar, Rajasthan, India is a Senior Secondary School offering instructions in Hindi medium at Secondary and Senior Secondary level. It is affiliated with Board of Secondary Education, Rajasthan.

Introduction
Nav Prerna Sikshan Sansthan is a co-educational institution catering to education of students from the kindergarten to class XII. The institute is affiliated to Board of Secondary Education, Rajasthan. The students appear in the Secondary and Senior Secondary Certificate examinations conducted by the Rajasthan Board. Founded in 1998, Nav Prerna Sikshan Sansthan has an impeccable record in the field of education. The institute caters to the educational, cultural, and recreational needs of more than 600 students from near and far. The students in the institute hail from many Indian states such as Rajasthan, Haryana, Uttar Pradesh, Bihar, and Andhra Pradesh.

History
The school is an offspring of earlier Prerana School started by Shri Khem Chand Mahlawat in Nawalgarh in the year 1991. The school was started in Sikar in 1998 in a rented building in Jat Colony named as Nav Prerana Shikshan Sansthan. The school started with 174 students in hostel. The total strength was only 360. The school continued in the same building for 2 years before it was shifted to the present campus in the year 2000. This year the school had more than 375 students as hostelers with a total of 600+ students.

Location
School is located near Truck Union on Nawalgarh Road . It takes 15–20 minutes to reach the school from RSRTC, Sikar Bus Depot and 10–15 minutes from Sikar Railway Station by an auto rickshaw.

See also
 Education in Sikar district

Boarding schools in Rajasthan
Educational institutions established in 1998
Buildings and structures in Sikar district
1998 establishments in Rajasthan
Education in Sikar